"Informer" is a song by Canadian reggae musician Snow, released in August 1992 as the first single from his debut album, 12 Inches of Snow (1993). Produced by MC Shan, who also contributed a rap verse, the single was a chart-topping hit, spending seven consecutive weeks at number one on the US Billboard Hot 100. It was his biggest hit in the United Kingdom, where it reached number two, behind two different number-one singles. The song is well known for the line "a licky boom boom down" and for Snow's fast toasting and often unintelligible lyrics. In 2007, it was ranked number 84 on VH1's "100 Greatest Songs of the 90s". Conversely, the song was included in Pitchforks 2010 list of "The Seven Worst U.S. Number One Singles of the 90s". 

In 2019, Puerto Rican singer, songwriter and rapper Daddy Yankee released a reimagination of "Informer" as "Con Calma" together with Snow, who recorded new parts. The Spanish-language remake topped the charts of 20 countries and reached the top 10 of 10 others.

Background and content 
Snow grew up as Darrin O'Brien in Toronto, Canada. He was raised on classic rock, but after Jamaicans moved into his neighborhood, due to then-Prime Minister Pierre Trudeau's revised immigration policies, reggae became a huge part of his life.

In 1992, while on vacation with DJ Marvin Prince in Queens, New York, Prince introduced Snow to American rapper and record producer MC Shan, and they produced a four-song demo. MC Shan then introduced Snow to producer–managers Steve Salem and David Eng, who signed him to their Motor Jam Records company, and licensed the music to East West Records. Shortly thereafter, Snow began serving an eight-month sentence in Toronto for assault. "Informer" began getting radio and MuchMusic airplay while he was incarcerated.

The song is based on a separate 1989 incident when Snow was charged with two counts of attempted murder. At the time, he was detained for a year in Toronto before the charges were reduced to aggravated assault, and he was eventually acquitted and freed.

In a 1999 interview, he referred to his criminal history as "a couple of bar fights."

Critical reception
AllMusic editor Ron Wynn called the song "patois-laced", noting further that it "shattered the myth that pop audiences wouldn't embrace any tune whose lyrics weren't in pristine English; when his video was released, it included a rolling translation at the bottom." M.R. Martinez from Cashbox felt it demonstrate Snow's "unique delivery which sounds less imitative than some dancehallers or rappers from the bonafide hood." Havelock Nelson from Entertainment Weekly declared the song as "slippery and tuneful". Swedish Expressen described it as "hard-boiled Jamaican crime fiction". Katrine Ring from Danish Gaffa viewed it as an "excellent pop-number". Dennis Hunt from Los Angeles Times felt "he adds a nifty dimension to dancehall by smoothly integrating pop textures." In his weekly UK chart commentary, James Masterton concluded that it "must surely be a contender for No.1 within a week or two." 

Alan Jones from Music Week complimented "this infectious, instantly appealing dancehall" song for achieving "the right mix between reggae and hip-hop." He added that it "should make quite a splash here." Cermak and Ross from The Network Forty commented, "You'd swear you were listening to a Jamaican straight out of Kingston, but this 22-year-old white male hails from Toronto's ghetto. Along with mixer DJ Prince and record producer and rapper MC Shan, Snow creates a hooky low-groover with infectious dancehall toasting." Jan DeKnock from Orlando Sentinel labeled it as "dancable". A reviewer from People Magazine felt that Snow's "incarcerations flavor the pumped up, hip-hop-infused single "Informer"." James Hamilton from the RM Dance Update called it both "excellent" and "jaunty". Parry Gettelman from The Sentinel named "Informer" one of two "best tracks" of the album, remarking that it "pair powerful rhythms with killer choruses - hear "Informer" once and just try to get it out of your head."

Chart performance
"Informer" proved to be very successful on the charts globally. In Europe, it peaked at number-one on the singles chart in Denmark, Finland, Germany, Ireland, Norway, Sweden and Switzerland, as well as on the Eurochart Hot 100. It made it to the top 10 also in Austria (2), France (3), Greece (6), Iceland (8), Italy (8), the Netherlands (2), Portugal (7), Spain (3), and the United Kingdom (2). In the latter, the single peaked in its third week at the UK Singles Chart, on March 21, 1993. It was held off reaching the top spot by Shaggy's "Oh Carolina". Outside Europe, it hit number-one in Australia, New Zealand, on the US Billboard Hot 100 and in Zimbabwe. 

"Informer" was awarded with a gold record in Austria and the Netherlands, a silver record in the UK and a platinum record in Germany, New Zealand and the US. In Australia, it received a 2× platinum record.

Music video

Directed by George Seminara, the accompanying music video for the song shows Snow entering a jail cell. His producer and friend, MC Shan, is also featured in the video; he explains how he got into prison by not turning informer. DJ Marvin Prince is seen enjoying a sauna with a couple of women. There are bikini clad women throughout and Snow is accompanied by female dancers glossed in black and white. When first shown, the video had no subtitles, but they were added because few people could comprehend what Snow was saying. "Informer" was later published on YouTube in September 2019. As of December 2022, the video had generated more than 36 million views.

One of the dancers is Mona Scott, who would later go into music management, starting Violator Management. She would go on to become owner of Monami Entertainment.

Awards and recognition
"Informer" won a Juno Award for Best Reggae Recording in 1994. In 2007, the song was ranked number 84 on VH1's 100 Greatest Songs of the 90s. In 2020, Cleveland.com ranked it at number 127 in their list of the best Billboard Hot 100 No. 1 song of the 1990s.

Legacy
Many reggae purists viewed the song, along with the works of Ini Kamoze, Diana King, Shaggy and Shabba Ranks, as another example of "watered down" commercial reggae that rose to international popularity in the 1990s. This song was later re-imagined into Daddy Yankee's hit single Con Calma released in 2019.

The sketch comedy show In Living Color, in a mock video featuring Jim Carrey as Snow, parodied the song.

Track listings

 CD maxi
 "Informer" (radio mix) – 4:11
 "Informer" (album mix Rick the Mexican remix edit) – 4:28
 "Informer" (drum mix) – 4:12
 "Informer" (Clark's fat bass mix) – 4:39
 "Informer" (Clark's super mix) – 4:51

 7-inch single
 "Informer" (radio edit) – 4:05
 "Informer" (album mix Rick the Mexican remix edit) – 4:28

 12-inch maxi
 "Informer" (LP version Rick the Mexican remix edit) – 4:28
 "Informer" (drum mix) – 4:12
 "Informer" (dub) – 4:12
 "Informer" (Clark's fat bass mix) – 4:39
 "Informer" (Clark's super radio mix) – 4:11
 "Informer" (super dub) – 4:50

 Cassette
 "Informer" (LP version Rick the Mexican remix edit) – 4:30
 "Informer" (drum mix) – 4:13

Personnel
 Text: Darrin O'Brien, Edmund Leary, Shawn Moltke
 Producer: MC Shan
 Executive producer: David Eng, EZ Steve Salem
 Co-producer: Edmund Leary, John "Jumpstreet" Ficarotta
 Photography: Melanie Nissen
 Informer remixer and editor: Rick the Mexican Huerta

Charts

Weekly charts

Year-end charts

Decade-end charts

Certifications

Release history

References

1992 songs
1992 debut singles
Billboard Hot 100 number-one singles
Canadian hip hop songs
Dancehall songs
East West Records singles
European Hot 100 Singles number-one singles
Irish Singles Chart number-one singles
Juno Award for Reggae Recording of the Year recordings
Number-one singles in Australia
Number-one singles in Denmark
Number-one singles in Finland
Number-one singles in Germany
Number-one singles in New Zealand
Number-one singles in Norway
Number-one singles in Sweden
Number-one singles in Switzerland
Number-one singles in Zimbabwe
Snow (musician) songs
Songs written by Snow (musician)